The Journal for the Study of Religion is a semi-annual journal published by the Association for the Study of Religion in Southern Africa. It was established in 1980 with the title Religion in Southern Africa, and adopted its current name in 1987.

See also
 Open access in South Africa

References

External links

Religious studies journals
Academic journals published by learned and professional societies
Biannual journals
Publications established in 1980